The Tunisian Women's Volleyball League is the highest level of women's volleyball in Tunisia and it is organized by Tunisian Volleyball Federation. The League is currently contested by 10 clubs.

The regular season is played by 10 teams, playing each other twice, once at home and once away from home. After the regular season, the four best-placed teams enter the play-offs and the last six teams enter the play-out.

2021–22 Nationale A teams

List of champions

Titles by club

See also 
 Tunisian Men's Volleyball League

References

External links
Tunisian Volleyball Federation 

Tunisia
League
Volleyball competitions in Tunisia